NFL GameDay 2000 is a video game developed by Red Zone Interactive and published by 989 Sports for the PlayStation in 1999. On the cover is Terrell Davis.

Reception

The game received "favorable" reviews according to the review aggregation website GameRankings. Frank O'Connor of NextGen said, "The top PlayStation football game gets deeper, but it ain't the best-looking football game in town anymore." The Rookie of GamePro said, "While Madden 2000, with its slightly deeper features set, stands atop the PlayStation pigskin world this season, NFL GameDay 2000 is still an excellent football title. It delivers a wealth of gameplay goods while still retaining the flava that made the previous GameDays big hits."

Notes

References

External links
 

1999 video games
NFL GameDay video games
North America-exclusive video games
PlayStation (console) games
PlayStation (console)-only games
Video games developed in the United States